China National Highway 312 (312国道), also referred to as Route 312 or The Mother Road, is a key east-west route beginning in Shanghai and ending at Khorgas, Xinjiang in the Ili River valley, on the border with Kazakhstan. In total it spans , passing through Jiangsu, Anhui, Henan, Shaanxi, Gansu before ending in Xinjiang. Besides Shanghai, cities of note on the route include Suzhou, Wuxi, Nanjing, Hefei, Xinyang, Nanyang, Xi'an, Lanzhou, Jiayuguan and Ürümqi.

It theoretically starts at People's Square, the Zero-Kilometre point for all highways starting in Shanghai, but the first part of the road, Cao-An Highway, starts at Cao-Yang New Village.

The road was the subject of Rob Gifford's 2007 book China Road, in which he describes traveling the entire length of Route 312 from the East China Sea to Central Asia.

The G40 Shanghai–Xi'an Expressway has replaced National Highway 312 as the main route between those two cities.

Route and distance

Accidents 
On October 10 2019, a bridge of G312 crossing Xigang Road in Wuxi was collapsed by several overloaded trucks, killing 3 people and injuring 2 others.

See also 

 China National Highways
 U.S. Route 66

References

External links 
Official website of Ministry of Transport of PRC

312
Road transport in Shanghai
Transport in Jiangsu
Transport in Anhui
Transport in Henan
Transport in Shaanxi
Transport in Gansu
Transport in Ningxia
Transport in Xinjiang